is the fourth single by Japanese entertainer Miho Nakayama. Written by Mariya Takeuchi, the single was released on February 5, 1986, by King Records.

Background and release
"Iro White Blend" was used by Shiseido for their spring 1986 commercials featuring Nakayama.

During the recording of the song, songwriter Mariya Takeuchi coached Nakayama in pronouncing the English lines of the lyrics. On live performances of the song, fans would wave white-colored handkerchiefs, towels, and hats.

"Iro White Blend" peaked at No. 5 on Oricon's weekly singles chart and sold over 223,000 copies, making it Nakayama's biggest-selling single until "Waku Waku Sasete" was released later that year.

Takeuchi self-covered the song on her 1987 album Request. Nakayama self-covered the song on her 2019 album Neuf Neuf.

Track listing
All tracks are written by Mariya Takeuchi; all music is arranged by Nobuyuki Shimizu.

Charts
Weekly charts

Year-end charts

Cover versions
 Eriko Nakamura (as Haruka Amami) covered the song on the 2010 soundtrack album The Idolm@ster Master Special "Spring".

References

External links

1986 singles
1986 songs
Japanese-language songs
Miho Nakayama songs
Mariya Takeuchi songs
King Records (Japan) singles